"" is a motto of the Republic of Turkey. Mustafa Kemal Atatürk used this phrase in his speech delivered for the 10th Anniversary of the Republic of Turkey, on 29 October 1933 (Republic Day) for the first time. In 1972, the Turkish Ministry of National Education added this phrase to the Student Oath. This was annulled by the AKP government in 2013, before it was reinstated by the Council of State in 2018. However, Ministry of Education appealed against the order and Council of State has again repealed Student Oath in 2021.

References

1933 in Turkey
1930s neologisms
October 1933 events
Kemalism
Mustafa Kemal Atatürk
Turkish nationalism
History of the Republic of Turkey
Turkish words and phrases
Mottos